The 2000 Sultan Azlan Shah Cup was the tenth edition of field hockey tournament the Sultan Azlan Shah Cup held in Kuala Lumpur, Malaysia. Pakistan won their successive second title after beating South Korea 1-0 with a late minute goal by Kamran Ashraf in the final becoming the first side to retain the Azlan Shah Cup since its inaugural edition. Pakistan's captain and goalkeeper Ahmed Alam was voted as player of the tournament.

Participating nations
Seven countries participated in the tournament:

Final ranking
This ranking does not reflect the actual performance of the team as the ranking issued by the International Hockey Federation. This is just a benchmark ranking in the Sultan Azlan Shah Cup only.

References

External links
Official website

2000 in field hockey
2000
2000 in Malaysian sport
2000 in Indian sport
2000 in Canadian sports
2000 in South Korean sport
2000 in New Zealand sport
2000 in German sport
2000 in Pakistani sport